San Andrés Yaá is a town and municipality in Oaxaca in south-western Mexico. The municipality covers an area of 33.17 km2. 
It is part of the Villa Alta District in the center of the Sierra Norte Region.

As of 2005, the municipality had a total population of 378.

References

Municipalities of Oaxaca